A by-election for the Islamic Consultative Assembly's constituency Tehran, Rey, Shemiranat, Eslamshahr and Pardis was held on 18 June 2021, to fill the vacancy caused by death of Fatemeh Rahbar. The voters cast their ballots along with the 2021 Iranian presidential election, the election for the City Council of Tehran, as well as another by-election for the Assembly of Experts.

It was won by Esmaeil Kousari, a brigadier general in the Islamic Revolutionary Guard Corps who had recently resigned from his office, and was officially supported by the conservative alliance Coalition Council of Islamic Revolution Forces. Two former MPs for the constituency, conservative Hamid Rasaei and Alireza Mahjoub of the Worker House ended up in the second and third place respectively.

The by-election had a low turnout, and is thought to have had an unprecedented number of invalid votes.

Results 
The top ten candidates out of 202 who ran for the seat, were:

References 

By-elections in Iran
Parliamentary elections in Tehran
2020s in Tehran